Michel Auclair (born Vladimir Vujović, ; 14 September 1922 – 7 January 1988) was an actor of Serbian and French ancestry, known best for his roles in French cinema.

Auclair was born to a Serbian father (born in Požarevac, Serbia) and a French mother in Koblenz.  His father was Vojislav Vujović, prominent Yugoslav Communist and secretary of the Communist Youth International. Auclair moved to Paris when he was three years old.
He entered medical school but then studied acting at the CNSAD in Paris.

While a major French star, he only had two English-language roles: as Professor Flostre in the 1957 musical Funny Face with Audrey Hepburn and Fred Astaire, and as a French police investigator in Day of the Jackal (1973) with Edward Fox.

Filmography

Films

Television shows and series

Television films

Stage

References

External links

 
 

1922 births
1988 deaths
French male film actors
French male television actors
French people of Montenegrin descent
French people of Serbian descent
Actors from Koblenz
20th-century French male actors
People from the Rhine Province
German emigrants to France